Karen Elizabeth Preston (born July 8, 1971) is a Canadian former competitive figure skater. She is the 1992 Grand Prix International de Paris silver medallist, a two-time Skate Canada International bronze medallist, a two-time (1989, 1992) Canadian national champion, and the 1987 Blue Swords Junior champion. She finished in the top ten at two World Championships and the 1992 Winter Olympics in Albertville.

Personal life 
Preston was born on July 8, 1971 in Toronto, Ontario. She attended Erindale Secondary School in Mississauga. She has two children, Lindsay (born  2004) and Ryan (born  2007), and became a naturalized U.S. citizen during her time in the United States.

Career 
Preston joined the Toronto Cricket, Skating and Curling Club (TCSCC) when she was nine years old.

She was awarded gold at the 1987 Blue Swords in East Germany. In the 1988–89 season, she won her first senior national title, ahead of Charlene Wong, and went on to compete at the 1989 World Championships in Paris, where she finished 11th.

Preston finished just off the national podium, in fourth place, during the next two seasons but received the bronze medal at the 1990 Nations Cup in Gelsenkirchen, Germany.

Preston began the 1991–92 season with a bronze medal at the 1991 Skate Canada International and went on to win her second national title, outscoring Josée Chouinard for gold. Both were selected to represent Canada at the 1992 Winter Olympics in Albertville. In France, Preston placed 12th in the short program, 8th in the free skate, and 8th overall, just ahead of Chouinard. Concluding her season, she finished 9th at the 1992 World Championships in Oakland, California.

The following season, she was awarded silver at the 1992 Grand Prix International de Paris, behind Surya Bonaly of France. She took silver behind Chouinard at the Canadian Championships and placed 8th at the 1993 World Championships in Prague.

In the 1993–94 season, Preston won bronze medals at the 1993 Skate Canada International and Canadian Championships. Ranked third behind Chouinard and Susan Humphreys, she did not make Canada's team to the 1994 Winter Olympics. During her competitive career, her coaches included Ellen Burka, Osborne Colson, Wally Diestelmeyer, and Louis Stong.

Preston coached in Connecticut, Florida, and Ann Arbor, Michigan, before joining the coaching staff at the TCSCC and Canadian Ice Academy in Toronto.

Competitive highlights

References

 
 

Canadian female single skaters
Figure skaters at the 1992 Winter Olympics
Olympic figure skaters of Canada
Figure skaters from Toronto
1971 births
Living people
Competitors at the 1990 Goodwill Games